Tito Tebaldi (born 20 September 1987) is an Italian rugby union player. He plays as scrum-half. 
He made his debut for Italy against Australia on 13 June 2009.

Career
Tebaldi is the nephew of former Italy fullback Daniele Tebaldi, began his career playing for Noceto, a team based in the Province of Parma. He joined Gran Parma of the Super 10 in 2006, making his debut at 19. After establishing himself as a regular starter during the 2008–09 season, Tebaldi quickly earned a reputation as one of the best young players in Italy. Tebaldi joined Aironi in May 2010 for their debut season in the Celtic League.

Nick Mallett included Tebaldi in the Italy squad for the 2009 mid-year rugby test series after Simon Picone pulled out for personal  reasons. Having made his debut as a replacement for Pablo Canavosio in the first test, Tebaldi  was the starting scrum-half for Italy's final two games of the tour. Tebaldi played in all three of Italy's end of year tests and established himself as the first choice scrum half for the 2010 Six Nations Championship.

On 2 March 2013 he signed with Ospreys where he played 18 games with one score.

It was announced on 3 December 2014 that he was joining Harlequins from Ospreys.

On 17 May 2016 Benetton Treviso announced the player as new scrum-half from the 2016–2017 season.
He played for Benetton until 2019–20 Pro14 season for to move to Petrarca Padova.

On 18 August 2019, he was named in the final 31-man squad for the 2019 Rugby World Cup.

References

1987 births
Living people
Sportspeople from Parma
Italian rugby union players
Rugby union scrum-halves
Italy international rugby union players
Zebre Parma players
Aironi players
Ospreys (rugby union) players
Expatriate rugby union players in England
Italian expatriate rugby union players
Harlequin F.C. players
Benetton Rugby players
Petrarca Rugby players